The Isotta Fraschini Tipo 8A is a luxury car made by the Italian manufacturer Isotta Fraschini from 1924 until 1931. It was the successor to the Tipo 8 model, with a new 7.3 litre straight-eight engine to replace the 5.9 litre unit used in the previous model. This new engine could produce . This was the most powerful mass-produced straight-8 engine in the world at that time. The Tipo 8A was offered only with bare chassis and engine for the coachbuilders.

The Isotta Fraschini car company promised that every car could do . The car was very luxurious and it cost more than a Model J Duesenberg. Around one third of these cars were sold in the United States. The characteristic car body was made by Swiss manufacturer Carrosserie Worblaufen.

Drivetrain
The Tipo 8A's inline 8-cylinder engine displacement was up to 7.4-liters, with overhead valves and cam — and like its predecessor, the Tipo 8, there was no external intake manifold, the twin carburetors being attached directly to the block. Transmission was a three-speed manual. The 8ASS (Super Sprint) package was also an option.

On today's market
In 2012, a barn find of an unrestored 1931 Isotta-Fraschini Tipo 8A with Lancefield Faux-Cabriolet 2-door coachwork was publicly offered for the first time since 1961 and fetched $186,500. In March 2013 a restored 1929 Isotta-Fraschini Tipo 8A with Convertible Sedan coachwork by Floyd-Derham sold for $473,000.

In Sunset Boulevard
A 1929 landaulet limousine example of the car with "coupe de ville" bodywork by Castagna of Milan, is featured in the 1950 film Sunset Boulevard as the car of lead character Norma Desmond, a forgotten silent movie star who in the film says

...we have a car. Not one of those cheap things made of chromium and spit but Isotta Fraschini. Have you ever heard of Isotta Fraschini? All hand-made. It cost me twenty eight thousand dollars.

(Adjusted for inflation, and assuming she bought the car in 1929, $28,000 would be .) William Holden as Joe Gillis, an unsuccessful screenwriter said, telling the story, "The whole thing was upholstered in leopard skin and had one of those car phones. All gold-plated." The "Sunset car" has been on display at Museo Nazionale dell'Automobile in Italy since 1972. Gloria Swanson's character Norma Desmond's initials are on the rear doors of the car.

The car used in the film was the #1587 owned in 1980s by Tom Monaghan.

Notes 

Tipo 8A
Cars introduced in 1924
1930s cars
Luxury vehicles